Yours Fatefully (simplified Chinese: 孤男寡女) is a Singaporean Chinese drama which was telecasted on Singapore's free-to-air channel, MediaCorp Channel 8. It was a mid-year blockbuster for 2012. It stars Kingone Wang, Jesseca Liu, Xiang Yun, Chen Shucheng, Eelyn Kok, Cavin Soh & Sora Ma as the casts of this series.

Plot
Su Xiaoyi is a single professional photographer who lives with his sickly father afflicted with night blindness. As his siblings are married, the burden of taking care of his ailing father naturally falls on him. Song Xinxin is a single professional make-up artist who lives with her mother suffering from an anxiety disorder. As her siblings have settled down with their own families, she has no choice but to live with her mother. The burden of looking after her mother naturally falls on her. These two individuals lead a colourless life of drudgery and loneliness until they meet each other on an arranged marriage date. Unfortunately, a misunderstanding causes the meeting to end on a sour note. This is followed by several unpleasant encounters. It is not until frequent contact due to work that both realise it is possible to have a cordial relationship exchanging thoughts. Gradually, they learn to appreciate each other's strengths, and love blossoms between them. What takes them by complete surprise is that Su Shuntian and Zhang Xiuying, after becoming friends at a senior citizens' activity, provide each other with a listening ear and build up an interesting relationship. They look forward to meeting each other, keeping the relationship from their children but unaware that both are in-laws. Both Su Shuntian and Zhang Xiuying have the idea of spending their lives together. Not only can they look after each other but they will no longer be a burden to their children. As Su Shuntian and Zhang Xiuying are about to make the announcement, Su Xiaoyi and Song Xinxin arrange for the two elderly parents to live in their new place. What will be the reaction? Surprised, shocked, dumbfounded, helpless...? How will the four of them face this situation? Let Su Shuntian and Zhang Xiuying have their way, or Su Xiaoyi and Song Xinxin? Or simply defy convention to become one happy family?

Cast

Star Awards 2013 nominations
Yours Fatefully received three nominations in Show 1 of the Star Awards. The other dramas that were nominated for Best Theme Song were It Takes Two, Don't Stop Believin''', Show Hand and Joys of Life''.

International broadcast
It was shown in Thailand on Thairath TV beginning on 21 May 2015.

See also
 Yours Fatefully episodes

References

Singapore Chinese dramas
2012 Singaporean television series debuts
Channel 8 (Singapore) original programming